Miranda Campa (31 January 1914 – 7 May 1989) was a Swiss-born Italian actress and voice actress.

Life and career 
Born Liliana Campa Capodaglio in Geneva, the nephew of actors  Pio Campa and Wanda Capodaglio, Campa studied acting at the Silvio d’Amico Academy of Dramatic Arts, graduating in 1938. Mainly active on stage, she was part, among others, of the theatrical companies of Vittorio Gassman, Andreina Pagnani and Giorgio Strehler at the Piccolo Teatro in Milan. She made her film debut at mature age, in 1949, usually cast in character roles, often playing religious figures. Campa was also very active as a voice actress and as a dubber.

Filmography

References

External links 
 

Italian film actresses
Italian television actresses
Italian stage actresses
Italian voice actresses
1914 births
1989 deaths
Actors from Geneva
Accademia Nazionale di Arte Drammatica Silvio D'Amico alumni
Swiss emigrants to Italy